Spur of the Moment is a 1931 Australian film directed by A. R. Harwood. It was one of the first Australian talking movies.

Plot
A wealthy socialite, Claire Rutherford (Beatrice Touzeau), visits her former lover, Tony Iredale (James Alexander), one night. The next day Tony is arrested for the murder of a bookmaker the night before. In order to protect Claire's reputation, Tony remains silent. However a Scotland Yard detective in Melbourne on holiday (William Green) manages to trap the killer.

Production
Harwood had attempted to make Australia's first talking movie, Out of the Shadows in 1931 but been unable to complete it. However he managed to secure backing from a Melbourne businessman to fund two low-budget films, this and Isle of Intrigue (1931) made in an old factory at 61 Stanley St West Melbourne which had been converted into a sound studio.

The story was written by Melbourne playwright Betty Roland using the name "Betty Davies". Filming began in June 1931 after a rehearsal period.

Reception
A contemporary review said the script "leaves several matters unexplained, and the eventual confession of the murderer is scarcely convincing... [it] depends almost entirely upon dialogue, and scarcely at all upon action."

The cast included Helene Best, daughter of Australian politician, Sir Robert Best.

Cast
 James Alexander as Anthony Iredale
 William Green	as Inspector Perry
 Guy Hastings as Chief of C.I.B.
 Darcy Kelway as Joe
 Syd Hollister as Alf
 Fred Patey as Pop
 Charles Bradley as Rutherford
 William Ralston as Burton
 Norman Balmer as Noble
 Russell Cramer as Detective
 Herb Moylan as Clerk of Courts
 Helene Best

References

External links
 Spur of the Moment at IMDb
Spur of the Moment at National Film and Sound Archive
Spur of the Moment at Oz Movies

1931 films
Australian black-and-white films
Australian drama films
1931 drama films